Pyanchi I (formally Anawrahta) was viceroy of Toungoo (Taungoo) from 1367 to 1375. He ruled the region like a sovereign king. But when he tried to revolt with Hanthawaddy's help in 1375, his nominal overlord King Swa Saw Ke of Ava had him assassinated near Prome (Pyay).

Brief
When his father King Theingaba of Toungoo died on 29 March 1367, Pyanchi was in exile at Pegu (Bago) in the Mon-speaking Kingdom of Hanthawaddy. Though he had been estranged from his father, Pyanchi returned to his native Toungoo (Taungoo), and took over the throne with the royal style of A-Saw Myat-Swa Nawrahta.

By then, Toungoo was back to the petty state that it once was before Theingaba set out to expand the former vassal state of Pinya in 1358. Theingaba, the first ruler of Toungoo to have successfully stayed independent, had been at war with Ava since 1365, and had been on the defensive. Ava had retaken the Pyinmana region from Toungoo since 1365−66, and defeated Toungoo's neighboring state Taungdwingyi as Pyanchi took over Toungoo. With Ava forces closing in, Pyanchi submitted to Ava.

As with those by previous Toungoo rulers, Pyanchi's submission was nominal. With Ava still firming up its borders with its neighboring states in the first half of the 1370s, Pyanchi essentially ruled his fiefdom like a sovereign king. When he saw that Ava had its hands full with the northern Shan states (1371−73), he began contemplating a rebellion. He had kept up his close ties with Pegu, and sought military assistance from Pegu when Ava and Lan Na, the kingdom east of Toungoo, moved closer to war in 1374. Though King Binnya U of Pegu had agreed to a non-aggression pact with King Swa Saw Ke of Ava in 1370, the Hanthawaddy ruler sent a sizable force consisting of infantry, cavalry and war elephants to Toungoo.

At Ava (Inwa), Swa was not yet willing to go to war with Pegu over Toungoo. Instead, the king sought another way, and enlisted his brother Gov. Saw Yan Naung of Prome's help. In 1375, Yan Naung proposed a marriage of state between his daughter and Pyanchi's son, Pyanchi II, with the marriage ceremony to be held in Prome (Pyay). Pyanchi understood the proposal of marriage to be the first step toward joint rebellion against Ava. A Toungoo−Prome axis backed by Pegu would form a formidable Lower Burma bulwark against Central Burma-based Ava. Pyanchi agreed to the proposal, and went to Prome with a small battalion. It was a trap. The Toungoo contingent was ambushed near Prome, and Pyanchi was killed although his son and son-in-law both escaped. It was  October 1375.

At Toungoo, Ma Sein, the commander of the Peguan army stationed there seized the throne, and held out for three months.

Notes

References

Bibliography
 
 
 
 

Ava dynasty
1375 deaths